The 2008 Sichuan earthquake, magnitude 7.9. ML, occurred at 14:28:01.42 CST (06:28:01.42 UTC) on 12 May 2008, with its epicenter in Wenchuan County, Sichuan province of the People's Republic of China. The disaster galvanized the CANGOs into soliciting numerous monetary donations and other forms of aid from across the globe, which has exceeded a collective total of US$456.9 million in cash contributions from sources outside the country. Inside mainland China, by 14 May, the Ministry of Civil Affairs stated that ¥ 10.7 billion (approximately $1.5 billion) had been donated by the Chinese public alone, including ¥ 4.185 billion yuan in the first week.

Summary

Organizations
United Nations: Spokesman for the Secretary-General of the United Nations, Michèle Montas, announced that the UN would give $7 million in aid to China.
International Olympic Committee: "The Olympic Movement is at your side, especially during these difficult moments. Our thoughts are with you." —Jacques Rogge. The International Olympic Committee has sent $1 million in aid.
European Union: "Our thoughts are with the injured and with the relatives of the victims of this serious earthquake. We all hope that many people can still be rescued alive from the rubble. Our sympathies are with all those people in China affected by this catastrophe." —Hans-Gert Pöttering. The European Commissioner for Development and Humanitarian Aid has sent €2 million euros in aid.
Vatican City Holy See: "I ask you to join me in fervid prayer for all those who have lost their lives," he said at his weekly general audience in St Peter's Square. [...] I am spiritually close to the people tried by such a devastating calamity ... may God grant strength to all those involved in the immediate needs of rescue work" —Pope Benedict XVI
International Red Cross and Red Crescent: The International Red Cross has released about $235,000 in emergency funds.
American Red Cross: The American Red Cross has donated $10,000,000.
British Red Cross: The British Red Cross has released $49,000 from its Disaster Fund and also launched an emergency appeal on 14 May 2008 to support the Red Cross Movement's response.
The Indonesian Red Cross Society has donated $10,000, and expressed their condolences to the victims.
Turkish Red Crescent sent its rescue team to the area with a budget of $500,000 as an initial response to the quake. Officials have also announced that the aid might be expanded according to the demands by the Red Cross Society of China.
Direct Relief: Direct Relief is sending an airlift of specifically requested medical aid to the Sichuan region and evaluating long-term aid to prosthetic and orthotic clinics.
Oxfam: Oxfam has contributed $1.55 million for emergency relief, rehabilitation and reconstruction.
Giving Children Hope: Giving Children Hope is sending a container of relief to China.
World Vision International: World Vision is stepping up its Sichuan earthquake appeal, calling for $2 million in order to launch a full-scale relief and rehabilitation programme. Immediate relief goods, including 800 tents, 30,000 quilts,  of food and 2,000 shelter tarpaulins, are being provided to survivors in Qingchuan County, a quake-affected county where World Vision has a community development programme. The goods are being purchased in-country and distributed by World Vision's local staff and relief teams.

Companies
Taiwanese companies

 Formosa Plastics Group offered $14.3 million.
 Hon Hai (Foxconn Technology Group): a top electronics maker from Taiwan plans to donate $8.6 million.

British companies
 AstraZeneca donated $143,000 and $71,000 worth of pharmaceuticals.
 BHP Billiton donated $500,000
 BP donated $200,000
 B&Q donated $143,000 and $179,000 in building supplies, quilts and towels
 Diageo donated $1.7 million
 Fairey Industrial Ceramics donated 500 countertop filters and 500 gravity filters to assist with the provision of clean water
 GSK donated $1.4 million
 HSBC donated $1.4 million to the Red Cross Society of China via the Hong Kong Red Cross. Up until 31 May 2008, any donations to a special earthquake account were matched by HSBC.
 JCB donated a fleet of 6 backhoe loaders to help with relief efforts
 Lehman Brown donated $14,000
 Marks & Spencer donated $143,000 through staff and company donations
 Palintest donated $71,000 worth of water quality testing and reagents
 Prudential (Taiwan) donated $98,000
 Standard Chartered (Hong Kong) donated $64,000
 PricewaterhouseCoopers donated $503,000
 Reed Expo donated $143,000
 Tesco donated $287,000 and will match staff donations totaling $71,000
 Unilever donated $1.4 million

United States companies
American International Group (AIG): American International Group Inc has donated $1.0 million to aid the disaster relief efforts. AIG also announced that it would match all employee contributions to the AIG Disaster Relief Fund.
Dell: Dell Incorporated and its employees have pledged up to $301,000 in donations. Employees' donations are matched by Dell through the company's Direct Giving Program.
Google.org: Google's public service arm Google.org will donate $1.5 million. Google will also match Googler's donations to other non-profits with Google's gift matching program. Googler's across the world have also organized various forms of aid such as blood drives, cash drives, targeted search, forum, and earthquake situation map.
Hewlett-Packard: Hewlett-Packard Company Foundation, HP and employees have pledged $2.75 million to relief efforts in China.
Merrill Lynch: Merrill Lynch pledges $1 Million to relief efforts in China. Additionally, it will match employee contribution up to $3,000 to the China Youth Development Foundation and the Red Cross International Response Fund.

References

Reactions
Sichuan earthquake
2008 in international relations